The members of the 30th Manitoba Legislature were elected in the Manitoba general election held in June 1973. The legislature sat from January 31, 1974, to September 6, 1977.

The New Democratic Party led by Edward Schreyer formed the government.

Sidney Spivak of the Progressive Conservative Party was Leader of the Opposition. Donald Craik became acting opposition leader in 1976 after Spivak was replaced by Sterling Lyon as party leader; Lyon was elected to the assembly in a by-election held later that year.

In 1976, the Workplace Safety and Health Act was passed; it established standards intended to help keep workers safe and healthy.

Peter Fox served as speaker for the assembly.

There were four sessions of the 30th Legislature:

William John McKeag was Lieutenant Governor of Manitoba until March 15, 1976, when Francis Lawrence Jobin became lieutenant governor.

Members of the Assembly 
The following members were elected to the assembly in 1973:

Notes:

By-elections 
By-elections were held to replace members for various reasons:

Notes:

References 

Terms of the Manitoba Legislature
1974 establishments in Manitoba
1977 disestablishments in Manitoba